Jacqui Hallum (born 1977) is a contemporary artist. She is the 2018 John Moores Painting Prize recipient. She has exhibited throughout the UK but also abroad. Hallum's solo display—entitled The View from the Top of the Pyramid—was exhibited at the Walker Art Gallery in 2019/2020.

Exhibitions
 Kingsgate Workshops (with Leon Kossoff)
 Exeter Phoenix Studio 74
 The View from the Top of the Pyramid, Walker Art Gallery, 12 October 2019 – 26 April 2020. Featuring words and pictures by Col O'Kell, the main attraction was the Moores Painting winning piece.
 Hastings Art Forum
 ESPS
 Lido, St Leonards-on-Sea

Awards
2018 John Moores Painting Prize recipient. She received the 30th biennial (£25,000 reward) for her painting King and Queen of Wands, chosen from over 27,000 entries. The piece was inspired by the Rider–Waite tarot deck. Since the 30th year marked the prize's 60th anniversary, Hallum was also gifted with a Walker Art Gallery solo display and a 3-month exhibition at the John Moores University.
 The Dundee Visual Artists Award
 The Worshipful Company of Painters and Stainers Bursary Award
 Arts and Humanities Research Board Bursary Award

References

External links

Living people
1977 births
British contemporary artists